Kubyak (Köbäk) is a rural locality (a selo) in Tavlarovsky Selsoviet, Buzdyaksky District, Bashkortostan, Russia. The population was 338 as of 2010. There are 6 streets.

Geography 
Kubyak is located 36 km north of Buzdyak (the district's administrative centre) by road. Starotavlarovo is the nearest rural locality.

References 

Rural localities in Buzdyaksky District